There have been three baronetcies created for persons with the surname Power, all in the Baronetage of the United Kingdom.

The Power Baronetcy, of Kilfane in the County of Kilkenny, was created in the Baronetage of the United Kingdom on 15 July 1836 for John Power. The title became dormant on the death of George Power, the seventh Baronet, in 1928.

The Power Baronetcy, of Edermine in the County of Wexford, was created in the Baronetage of the United Kingdom on 18 October 1841 for John Power, a member of the Powers distilling dynasty. The second and third Baronets represented County Wexford in the House of Commons. The title became extinct on the death of the sixth Baronet in 1930.

The Power Baronetcy, of Newlands Manor in Milford in the County of Southampton, was created in the Baronetage of the United Kingdom on 1 February 1924 for John Power. He was the founder of the Royal Institute for International Affairs and represented Wimbledon in the House of Commons as a Unionist. The second Baronet was a member of the London County Council.

Power baronets, of Kilfane (1836)

Sir John Power, 1st Baronet (died 1844)
Sir John Power, 2nd Baronet (1798–1873)
Sir Richard Crampton Power, 3rd Baronet (1843–1892)
Sir John Elliott Cecil Power, 4th Baronet (1870–1900)
Sir Elliott Derrick le Poer Power, 5th Baronet (1872–1902)
Sir Adam Clayton Power, 6th Baronet (1844–1903)
Sir George Power, 7th Baronet (1846–1928); as a young singer, Power originated the tenor roles in H.M.S. Pinafore and The Pirates of Penzance)

Currently, the baronetcy is Dormant.

Power baronets, of Edermine (1841)
Sir John Power, 1st Baronet (1771–1855)
Sir James Power, 2nd Baronet (1800–1877)
Sir John Talbot Power, 3rd Baronet (1845–1901)
Sir James Douglas Talbot Power, 4th Baronet (1884–1914)
Sir James Talbot Power, 5th Baronet (1851–1916)
Sir Thomas Talbot Power, 6th Baronet (1863–1930)

The baronetcy became Extinct with the death of the 6th Baronet.

Power baronets, of Newlands Manor (1924)

Sir John Cecil Power, 1st Baronet (1870–1950)
Sir Ivan McLannahan Power, 2nd Baronet (1903–1954)
Sir John Patrick McLannahan Power, 3rd Baronet (1928–1984)
Sir Alastair John Cecil Power, 4th Baronet (born 1958)

The heir apparent to the baronetcy is Mark Alastair John Power (born 1989), only son of the 4th Baronet.

Notes

References
Kidd, Charles, Williamson, David (editors). Debrett's Peerage and Baronetage (1990 edition). New York: St Martin's Press, 1990, 

Baronetcies in the Baronetage of the United Kingdom
Extinct baronetcies in the Baronetage of the United Kingdom
Dormant baronetcies